Maggies Peaks refers to a mountain in the Sierra Nevada mountain range, southwest of Lake Tahoe. There are two peaks on the mountain about 0.7 miles (1 km) apart. The mountain is located in the Desolation Wilderness in El Dorado County, California. The summits overlook Lake Tahoe and affords very good views of the lake.

References

External links 
 
 

Mountains of the Desolation Wilderness